Otto Leopold of Limburg Stirum, count of Limburg Styrum and Bronckhorst, sovereign lord zu Gemen and Raesfeld, was born in 1688 the son of Hermann Otto II of Limburg Stirum.

He became lord zu Gemen in 1704 at the death of his father, and remained until his death in 1754.

He also inherited from his grandfather Alexander IV count von Velen zu Raesfeld the Lordship of Raesfeld.

He married in 1706 countess Anna Elisabeth von Schönborn (born 1686, died 1757) and they had issue:

 Friedrich Karl, count of Limburg Styrum and Bronckhorst, sovereign lord zu Gemen (born 1710, died 1771);
 August Philipp Karl, Prince-Bishop of Speyer, count of Limburg Styrum and Bronckhorst, sovereign lord zu Gemen (born 1721, died ¼1797);
 Charlotte Amalie, who died ca 1713.

Otto Leopold
1688 births
1754 deaths
Generals of the Holy Roman Empire